Tey Kok Kiew is a Malaysian politician who served as Member of the Melaka State Executive Council (EXCO) in the Pakatan Harapan (PH) state administration under former Chief Minister Adly Zahari from May 2018 to the collapse of the PH state administration in March 2020 as well as Member of the Melaka State Legislative Assembly (MLA) for Bandar Hilir from March 2008 to November 2021. He is a member from Democratic Action Party (DAP), a component party of the PH coalition. He has served as State Chairman of DAP of Melaka for the second term since January 2023 and served the first term from December 2015 to his resignation in November 2021 following a huge defeat of DAP in the 2021 Melaka state election.

Politics
Tey initially contested as a DAP candidate in the 2008 Melaka state election for the Bandar Hilir state seat in 2008 and went on to defend the seat in the 2013 and 2018 Melaka state elections. Tey was fielded by the party to spearhead the DAP younger faces in the subsequent 2021 Malacca state election as the PH candidate replacing the incumbent Wong Fort Pin who was however dropped to contest Bemban seat which was considered a more risky election for DAP and Tey.

Controversies and issues 
In 2018, DAP secretary-general Lim Guan Eng had rebuked Tey, the DAP Malacca chief and Wong, the Deputy Speaker of Malacca State Legislative Assembly and assemblyman of Bemban then on their acceptance of the Malacca state "Datukship" in their first year as MLA which had breached the party's long-standing principal agreed upon since the mid-1990s on DAP elected representatives not to receive honours awards during their active political service period. Lim called for those involved to apologise which Wong had obliged and even offered to return the award but Tey did not and remained adamant. Tey opined the party should have inform the King, state rulers or governors for such principal policy.

Election results

Honours

Honours of Malaysia
  :
  Companion Class I of the Order of Malacca (DMSM) – Datuk (2018)

References

External links
 

1972 births
Living people
People from Malacca
Malaysian people of Hokkien descent
Malaysian people of Chinese descent
Democratic Action Party (Malaysia) politicians
Members of the Malacca State Legislative Assembly
Malacca state executive councillors
21st-century Malaysian politicians